Zhao Wei (趙 巍, born January 27, 1979) is a retired female hammer thrower from PR China. She set her personal best (70.67 metres) on April 5, 2003 at a meet in Nanning.

Achievements

See also
China at the World Championships in Athletics

References
 
 sports-reference
 hammerthrow.wz

1979 births
Living people
Athletes (track and field) at the 2000 Summer Olympics
Chinese female hammer throwers
Olympic athletes of China
Competitors at the 2001 Summer Universiade